Tower Hamlets Cemetery Park is a local nature reserve and historic cemetery in the London Borough of Tower Hamlets within the East End of London. It is regarded as one of the seven great cemeteries of the Victorian era (now known as the "Magnificent Seven").

The cemetery opened in 1841 and closed for burials in 1966. The cemetery park today encompasses the original cemetery, bounded by historic walls, and additional pockets of land including "Scrapyard Meadow" and the Ackroyd Drive Greenlink.

It was originally named The City of London and Tower Hamlets Cemetery but was called Bow Cemetery by locals. The cemetery pre-dates the creation of the modern Borough of Tower Hamlets in 1965, and instead takes its name from the original, older and somewhat larger, Tower Hamlets (or Tower division) – from which the modern borough also takes its name. The historic parish boundary which defines the Mile End and Bromley-by-Bow areas runs north to south through the park, with Mile End to the west and Bromley-by-Bow to the east.

Location
The Main Gate is on Southern Grove (on the crossing with Hamlets Way). There are also small gates on Hamlet Way and Cantrell Road. The nearest tube stations are Mile End and Bow Road.

The site is managed by the Friends of Tower Hamlets Cemetery Park, a registered charity in the UK founded in 1990. The Friends are headquartered at the Soanes Centre within the Park.

History
Before the Victorian era, all of London's dead were buried in small urban churchyards, which were so overcrowded and so close to where people lived, worked, and worshipped that they were causing disease and ground water contamination.

An Act of Parliament was passed which allowed joint-stock companies to purchase land and set up large cemeteries outside the boundaries of the City of London. There were seven great cemeteries (the "Magnificent Seven") laid out about the same time (1832–41). Highgate Cemetery is the most well known; the others are Nunhead, West Norwood, Kensal Green, Brompton, Abney Park.

The City of London and Tower Hamlets Cemetery Company was made up of eleven wealthy directors whose occupations reflected the industries of the day: corn merchant, merchant ship broker and ship owner, timber merchant, and Lord Mayor of the City of London. The company bought  of land and the cemetery was divided into a consecrated part for Anglican burials and an unconsecrated part for all other denominations.

Tower Hamlets Cemetery was formally consecrated by the Bishop of London Charles James Blomfield on Saturday 4 September 1841 prior to being opened for burials. The cemetery was consecrated in the morning; the first burial took place in the afternoon.

Tower Hamlets Cemetery was very popular with people from the East End and by 1889 247,000 bodies had been interred; the cemetery remained open for another 77 years. In the first two years 60% of the burials were in public graves and by 1851 this had increased to 80%. Public graves were the property of the company and were used to bury those whose families could not afford to buy a plot.  Several persons, entirely unrelated to each other, could be buried in the same grave within the space of a few weeks. Allegedly some graves were dug 40 feet deep and contained up to 30 bodies.

The cemetery itself did not remain in a tidy and elegant state for long. Only 55 years after it was opened it was reported to be in a neglected state. During the Second World War the cemetery was bombed five times during raids on the City of London; both cemetery chapels were damaged and shrapnel damage can be seen on the graves by the 1994 Soanes Centre in the north-west corner of the park. Burials continued taking place until 1966, when the Greater London Council (G.L.C.) bought the company for £100,000 under the G.L.C.(General Powers) Act and the ground was closed for burials. The intention was to create an open space for the public and relevant parts of the cemetery were freed from the effects of consecration. Strong local opposition and problems of funding stopped the clearance.

Today
Tower Hamlets London Borough Council took over the ownership of the park in 1986.  It was declared a Local Nature Reserve in May 2000 along with adjacent open land on Cantrell Road and Ackroyd Drive.  It has also been designated as Site of Metropolitan Importance for Nature Conservation and a Conservation area.  The high brick walls which surround it are on the national register of listed buildings as are seven individual memorials (all Grade II).

The Friends of Tower Hamlets Cemetery Park is an independent charity established in 1990 because there were concerns over the increasing neglect by successive owners. The charity's main objective is to encourage greater use of this inner urban green space as a sanctuary for people and a place of biodiversity. The Friends manage the park under a service-level agreement with the Borough.

The park has been designated a Local Nature Reserve. The cemetery now resembles natural woodland, with many bird and insect species making it their home, although there are still a large amount of gravestones and funerary monuments. There are several trails and walks created by the Friends of Tower Hamlets Cemetery Park.

The park is open 24 hours per day, although the Main Gate on Southern Grove is locked at dusk. Smaller foot gates around the park remain open for access.

Soanes Centre
The Soanes Centre to the west of the park in Mile End is the base of Setpoint London East, an organisation that provides workshops, promoting science and technology, for primary and secondary students. The building is located immediately to the right of the entrance on Southern Grove, opposite the grave of the Soanes family. The centre is also the home of The Friends of Tower Hamlets Cemetery Park.

Notable burials

Those who are buried or have memorials here include:
 Charlie Brown: publican of the Railway Tavern
 Major John Buckley VC: soldier and one of the first recipients of the Victoria Cross, for his bravery in the Indian Rebellion of 1857
 Will Crooks: trade unionist, leader in the London dock strike of 1889 and first Labour Mayor of Poplar
 Zilpha Elaw, African-American preacher and spiritual autobiographer.
 Clara Grant OBE, nicknamed "The Bundle Woman of Bow": educator and social reformer. A local primary school is named after her. She was also the founder of the Fern Street settlement.
 Alexander Hurley: singer and comedian, second husband of Marie Lloyd
 Charles Jamrach: animal supplier to P. T. Barnum and others
 Alfred Linnel: trampled by a police horse during a demonstration in Trafalgar Square. His funeral was organised by Annie Besant and William Morris.
 Dr Rees Ralph Llewellyn: performed autopsy on Mary Ann Nichols, considered the first victim of Jack the Ripper
 Robert McLachlan: early entomologist
 Henry Norris: civil engineer who began his career with repairs to the then Eddystone Lighthouse and later on supervised the construction of the first lighthouse in the world to be designed and built for an electric light powered by alternating current
 John Northey: died in the Princess Alice disaster in 1878
 Hannah Maria Purcell: widow of William Purcell, carpenter of HMS Bounty
 John "White Hat" Willis: son of John "Jock" Willis (known as Old Stormy Willis), founder of Jock Willis Shipping Line (a company that owned, among others, the Cutty Sark)

Others:
 Some victims of the Bethnal Green Disaster
 Monument to children who were in the care of the charity of Thomas Barnardo, and were buried elsewhere in the cemetery in unmarked graves
 Graves of the Charterhouse Brothers, Carthusian monks who lived in the London Charterhouse
 French graves, French workers who came to London to help refine gold from the Australian gold rushes, the Rothschilds had already been refining gold in Paris
 The Blitz Memorial, a memorial to those who died in The Blitz, made of bricks from damaged properties
 The Westwood Monument: Joseph Westwood (both father and son) were involved in the iron industry, including the building of iron ships and other constructions
 The War Memorial, located near the entrance on Southern Grove

War graves

There are 279 Commonwealth service personnel of both World Wars buried here, the names of all being listed on bronze panels on a screen wall memorial in the Mile End section of the park near the entrance on Southern Grove, as are those of four Dutch merchant seamen.  Nine British merchant seamen are buried here who were killed when their ship, SS Bennevis, was hit by a high explosive bomb on 7 September 1940, while berthed in the West India Docks, during an air raid in World War II.

References

External links
 Tower Hamlets Council Parks website
 Aerial view from 1934, from the English Heritage "Britain from Above" archive

Cemeteries in London
Parks and open spaces in the London Borough of Tower Hamlets
1841 establishments in England
Anglican cemeteries in the United Kingdom
Local nature reserves in Greater London
Commonwealth War Graves Commission cemeteries in England
Mile End